Ali Abass Yahya Al-Dailami (born 27 December 1981) is a German-Yemeni politician of The Left who is serving as member of the Bundestag since 2021 and one of six deputy leaders of his party since 2018.

Early life
Al-Dailami was born in 1981 in Sanaa, Yemen. When he was eight years old, his family fled to Germany as refugees. He attended elementary school in Sankt Julian in the state of Rhineland-Palatinate. Ali's mother died when he was twelve years old, and he was placed in a children's home at his own request. He lived at several different Children and Youth Services facilities, including one in Lich, Hesse.

Upon turning 18, Al-Dailami dropped out of school and moved to Giessen. There, he earned his Mittlere Reife at a night school. He was dependent on unemployment benefits and, among other things, did contract work for Canon on an assembly line and in a warehouse, among other things. He then took an apprenticeship as a restaurant clerk.

Political career
Al-Dailami joined The Left in 2006. The same year, he co-founded the Left Youth Solid branch in Giessen and become its spokesman. He was also elected to the executive committee of The Left's Giessen association. From 2007–08, he was a member of the party's Hessian state executive. He was also spokesman for the state working group on migration, integration and anti-racism from 2007 to 2012, when he became federal spokesman for the same topics. The next year, he became chairman of the Giessen party association. He was elected to The Left's federal executive in 2008, and as one of six deputy leaders in 2018.

Al-Dailami ran in the 2013 German federal election in the Gießen constituency, winning 5.1% of votes. He was sixth on the state party list but was not elected. He ran again in 2017 and won 6.3%, again failing to enter the Bundestag. He unsuccessfully ran in the 2019 European Parliament election.

While campaigning in April 2014, Al-Dailami was assaulted and required hospital treatment. He filed a criminal complaint against his attacker.

In the 2021 German federal election, Al-Dailami was the lead candidate for The Left in Hesse. He was second on the state party list, behind federal lead candidate Janine Wissler, and was elected to the Bundestag. He won 4.0% of votes in the Gießen constituency.

Within the party, Al-Dailami is considered an ally of Sahra Wagenknecht.

During the 2021 Chilean general election, Al-Dailami endorsed Apruebo Dignidad candidate Gabriel Boric.

Personal life
Al-Dailami has eleven siblings, including half-siblings. He is an atheist.

References

External links

Living people
1981 births
Members of the Bundestag for Hesse
Members of the Bundestag for The Left
German people of Yemeni descent
Naturalized citizens of Germany
21st-century German politicians
21st-century Yemeni politicians
German atheists
Yemeni atheists
People from Sanaa
People from Giessen
Members of the Bundestag 2021–2025